The N75 road is a national secondary road in Ireland. It runs for its entire length in County Tipperary, east to west from Thurles to its junction with the M8 motorway close to the village of Two-Mile Borris.

The N75 is only  in length.

See also
Roads in Ireland 
Motorways in Ireland
National primary road
Regional road

References
Roads Act 1993 (Classification of National Roads) Order 2006 – Department of Transport

National secondary roads in the Republic of Ireland
Roads in County Tipperary